Crossnore is a town in Avery County, North Carolina, United States. The population was 192 at the 2010 census.

Geography
Crossnore is located at  (36.020432, -81.929157).

History 

The Crossnore Presbyterian Church, Crossnore School Historic District, Weaving Room of Crossnore School, and Milligan Shuford Wise and Theron Colbert Dellinger Houses are listed on the National Register of Historic Places.

Demographics

As of the census of 2000, there were 242 people, 96 households, and 62 families residing in the town. The population density was 548.8 people per square mile (212.4/km2). There were 119 housing units at an average density of 269.9 per square mile (104.4/km2). The racial makeup of the town was 93.80% White, 0.41% African American, 4.13% Native American, and 1.65% from two or more races. Hispanic or Latino of any race were 4.55% of the population.

There were 96 households, out of which 29.2% had children under the age of 18 living with them, 54.2% were married couples living together, 8.3% had a female householder with no husband present, and 35.4% were non-families. 33.3% of all households were made up of individuals, and 13.5% had someone living alone who was 65 years of age or older. The average household size was 2.42 and the average family size was 3.13.

In the town, the population was spread out, with 29.8% under the age of 18, 6.6% from 18 to 24, 27.3% from 25 to 44, 24.0% from 45 to 64, and 12.4% who were 65 years of age or older. The median age was 34 years. For every 100 females, there were 87.6 males. For every 100 females age 18 and over, there were 82.8 males.

The median income for a household in the town was $24,688, and the median income for a family was $40,000. Males had a median income of $26,250 versus $23,125 for females. The per capita income for the town was $13,960. About 12.5% of families and 12.8% of the population were below the poverty line, including 16.5% of those under the age of eighteen and 14.6% of those 65 or over.

Education
A group home named The Crossnore School, Inc., was established in 1913 and now houses approximately 100 students.  Crossnore School has been praised for providing high-quality care at a lower cost than typical for most orphanages.

Notable people
 Tommy Burleson  former NBA player, played on 1974 NC State National Champion team, and 1972 USA Olympic team
 Virginia Foxx  member of the United States House of Representatives for North Carolina's 5th congressional district (since 2005)

References

Towns in Avery County, North Carolina